Ursinia pulchra (syn. Sphenogyne speciosa Knowles & Westc.) is a flowering plant in the family Asteraceae, which is used as an ornamental plant.

References

External links

Anthemideae